Ching Chau or Tsing Chau may refer to:

Ilha Verde, former island, now an area on Macau Peninsula, Macau
Green Island, Hong Kong, an island within Central and Western District, Hong Kong, Hong Kong
Steep Island, Hong Kong, an island near Clear Water Bay within Sai Kung District, the New Territories, Hong Kong
Ching Chau, an island in Tsam Chuk Wan, within Sai Kung District, the New Territories, Hong Kong
Pillar Island, a former island in Rambler Channel, the New Territories, Hong Kong
 Tsing Chau, an islet near Sharp Island, the New Territories, Hong Kong, with a lighthouse

See also
Qingzhou (disambiguation) — Mandarin equivalent
Green Island (disambiguation)